Michelle Bromley (born 24 December 1987) is an Australian table tennis player. 

She competed in the 2020 Summer Olympics. She lost to Natalia Partyka of Poland 4-0 in the first round. She also competed with Jian Fang Lay and Melissa Tapper in the women's team event but were defeated by Germany 3-0 in the round of 16.

References

External links
 

1987 births
Living people
Table tennis players at the 2020 Summer Olympics
Australian female table tennis players
Olympic table tennis players of Australia
People from Blacktown, New South Wales
Sportswomen from New South Wales